The calendrical systems devised and used by the pre-Columbian cultures of Mesoamerica, primarily a 260-day year, were used in religious observances and social rituals, such as divination.

These calendars have been dated to early as ca. 1100 BCE. By 500 BCE at the latest, the essentials were fully defined and functional. 260-day calendars are still used in the Guatemalan highlands, Veracruz, Oaxaca and Chiapas, Mexico.

The importance of aboriginal calendars in ritual and other aspects of Mesoamerican life was noted by many missionary priests, travelers, and colonial administrators, and later by ethnographers who described and recorded the cultures of contemporary Mesoamerican ethnic groups.

Types of calendars
Among the various calendar systems in use, two were particularly central and widespread across Mesoamerica. Common to all recorded Mesoamerican cultures, and the most important, was the 260-day calendar, a ritual calendar with no confirmed correlation to astronomical or agricultural cycles. Apparently the earliest Mesoamerican calendar to be developed was known by a variety of local terms, and its named components and the glyphs used to depict them were culture-specific. However, it is clear that type of calendar functioned in essentially the same way across cultures, and across the chronological periods when it was maintained.

The second of the major calendars was one representing a 365-day period approximating the tropical year, known sometimes as the "vague year". Because it was an approximation, over time the seasons and the true tropical year gradually "wandered" with respect to this calendar, owing to the accumulation of the differences in length. There is little hard evidence to suggest that the ancient Mesoamericans used any intercalary days to bring their calendar back into alignment. However, there is evidence to show Mesoamericans were aware of this gradual shifting, which they accounted for in other ways without amending the calendar itself.

These two 260- and 365-day calendars could also be synchronised to generate the Calendar Round, a period of 18980 days or approximately 52 years. The completion and observance of this Calendar Round sequence was of ritual significance to a number of Mesoamerican cultures.

A third major calendar form known as the Long Count is found in the inscriptions of several Mesoamerican cultures, most famously those of the Maya civilization who developed it to its fullest extent during the Classic period (ca. 200–900 CE). The Long Count provided the ability to uniquely identify days over a much longer period of time, by combining a sequence of day-counts or cycles of increasing length, calculated or set from a particular date in the mythical past. Most commonly, five such higher-order cycles in a modified vigesimal (base-20) count were used.

The use of Mesoamerican calendrics is one of the cultural traits that Paul Kirchhoff used in his original formulation to define Mesoamerica as a culture area. Therefore, the use of Mesoamerican calendars is specific to Mesoamerica and is not found outside its boundaries.

Since the sixteenth century, most communities have lost both of these once universal calendars, but one—or, rarely, both—has survived in diverse linguistic groups through the twentieth century.

Ritual 260-day calendar

In the 260-day cycle 20 day names pairs with 13 day numbers, totaling a cycle of 260 days.  This cycle was used for divination purposes to foretell lucky and unlucky days. The date of birth was also used to give names to both humans and gods in many Mesoamerican cultures; some cultures used only the calendar name whereas others combined it with a given name. As a result, the word for “day” also means “name” in some Mesoamerican languages. Each day sign was presided over by a god and many had associations with specific natural phenomena..

History
Earliest written evidence for the 260 calendar include the San Andres glyphs (Olmec, 650 BCE, giving the possible date 3 Ajaw) and the San Jose Mogote danzante (Zapotec, 600 - 500 BCE, giving the possible date 1 Earthquake), in both cases assumed to be used as names. However, the earliest evidence of the use of the 260-day cycle comes from astronomical alignments in the Olmec region and western Maya Lowlands, dating to about 1100 BCE.

The exact origin of the 260-day count is not known, but there are several theories. One theory is that the calendar came from mathematical operations based on the numbers thirteen and twenty, which were important numbers to the Maya. The numbers multiplied together equal 260.

Another theory is that the 260-day period came from the length of human pregnancy. This is close to the average number of days between the first missed menstrual period and birth, unlike Naegele's rule which is 40 weeks (280 days) between the last menstrual period and birth. It is postulated that midwives originally developed the calendar to predict babies' expected birth dates.

A third theory comes from understanding of astronomy, geography and paleontology.  The Mesoamerican calendar probably originated with the Olmecs, and a settlement existed at Izapa, in southeast Chiapas, Mexico, before 1200 BCE. There, at a latitude of about 15° N, the Sun passes through zenith twice a year, and there are 260 days between zenithal passages, and gnomons (used generally for observing the path of the Sun and in particular zenithal passages), were found at this and other sites. The sacred almanac may well have been set in motion on August 13, 1359 BCE, in Izapa.

Trecenas
In the post-classic Aztec calendar the periods of 13 days called a trecena in Spanish (no indigenous word for this period is known) were also important. The days of a trecena were usually numbered from 1 to 13. There were some exceptions, such as in the Tlapanec area where they were counted from 2 to 14. The first day of the trecena, and the god who was its patron, ruled the following thirteen days. If the first  day of a trecena was auspicious then so were the next twelve days.

365-day calendar
This 365-day calendar corresponded was divided into 18 'months' of 20 days each, plus 5 'nameless' days at the end of the year. The 365 day year had no leap year so it varied from the solar year by a quarter of a day each year.

The years were given their name in much the same way as the days of the 260-day calendar, 20 names were paired with 13 numbers giving 52 different possibilities for year names

Veintenas
In the post-classic Aztec calendar the 20 days called veintenas in Spanish and meztli, meaning moon, in Nahuatl, were also important.

The five unlucky days
The five unlucky days were called nemontemi in Mexico. Most believe them to have come at the end of each year, but since we do not know when the year started, we cannot know for sure. We do know though, that in the Maya area these five days (called wayeb in Maya) were always the last days of the year.

The nemontemi were seen as 'the useless days' or the days that were dedicated to no gods, and they had prognostic power for the coming year. Therefore, People tried to do as little as possible on these days, and a person who was born during the nemontemi was considered unlucky.

Calendar Round
Since both the 260-day and the 365-day calendar repeat, approximately every 52 years they reach a common end, and a new Calendar Round begins. This 52-year cycle was the most important for most Mesoamericans, with the apparent exception of the Maya elite until the end of the Classic Era, who gave equal importance to the long count calendar.
According to their mythology, at the end of one of these 52-year cycles the world would be destroyed by the gods, as it had been, three times in the Popul Vuh and four times for the Aztecs. While waiting for this to happen, all fire was extinguished, utensils were destroyed to symbolize new beginnings, people fasted and rituals were carried out. This was known as the New Fire Ceremony. When dawn broke on the first day of the new cycle, torches were lit in the temples and brought out to light new fires everywhere, and ceremonies of thanksgiving were performed.

Calendar Wheels
The term calendar wheel generally refers to Colonial-period images that display cycles of time in a circular format. Central Mexican calendar wheels incorporate the eighteen annual festivals or the 52-year cycle. In the Maya area, calendar wheels depict a cycle of 13 K'atuns. The only known pre-Hispanic K'atuns wheel appears on a stone turtle from Mayapán.

The earliest known Colonial-period calendar wheel is actually depicted in a square format, on pages 21 and 22 of the Codex Borbonicus, an Aztec screenfold that divides the 52-year cycle into two parts. The Codex Aubin, also known as the Codex of 1576, shows the 52-year calendar in a rectangular format on a single page. Most other calendar wheels use a circular format. The Boban calendar wheel, an early sixteenth-century calendar on native paper, depicts the Central Mexican cycle of eighteen festivals in clockwise rotation, with Arabic numerals used to total the number of days; virtually all the text is in Nahuatl. Some paired festivals share the same glyph, but they are represented in different sizes, the first being the “small feast” and the second the “great feast.” In the center, a 7 Rabbit date (1538) appears with text and images that refer to Tetzcocan town officers.

Religion and calendrics

Lords of the day
In the post-classic Aztec calendar, there were 13 Lords of the Day. These were gods (and goddesses) who each represented one of the 13 days in the trecenas of the 260-day calendar. The same god always represented the same day. Quetzalcohuatl (The feathered serpent), for example, always accompanied the 9th day.

Lords of the Night

There are only nine Lords of the Night, which means that they cannot always represent the same day, but the list of gods repeats itself again and again so each lord accompanies a new number each trecena.
Some think that there are nine Lords of the Night because they are connected to the nine levels of the underworld.

Long Count

The 365-day and the 260-day calendars identified and named the days, but not the years. The combination of a solar year date and a 260-year date was enough to identify a specific date to most people's satisfaction, as such a combination did not occur again for another 52 years, above general life expectancy. To measure dates over periods longer than 52 years, the Mesoamericans devised the Long Count calendar. This calendar system was probably developed by the Olmecs and later adopted by the Maya. The use of the long count is best attested among the classic Maya, it is not known to have been used by the central Mexican cultures.

The Long Count calendar identifies a date by counting the number of days from August 11, 3114 BCE in the proleptic Gregorian calendar or September 6, 3114 BCE in the Julian Calendar (-3113 astronomical). The Long Count days were tallied in a modified base-20 scheme. Thus 0.0.0.1.5 is equal to 25, and 0.0.0.2.0 is equal to 40.

Correlations

Long count

The correlation is based on historical, archaeological and astronomical evidence.

The commonly established way of expressing the correlation between the Maya calendar and the western calendars is to provide number of days from the start of the Julian Period (Monday, January 1, 4713 BCE) to the start of creation on 13.0.0.0.0 4 Ajaw, 8 Kumk'u.

The most commonly accepted correlation is the "Goodman, Martinez, Thompson" correlation (GMT correlation). The GMT correlation establishes that the creation date occurred on September 6 (Julian) or  August 11 (Gregorian), 3114 BC (-3113 astronomical), Julian day number (JDN) 584283.

Maya Calendar

The Maya version of the 260-day calendar is commonly known to scholars as the Tzolkin, or Tzolk'in in the revised orthography of the Academia de Lenguas Mayas de Guatemala. The Tzolk'in is combined with the 365-day calendar (known as the Haab, or Haab''' ), to form a synchronized cycle lasting for 52 Haabs, called the Calendar Round. The Maya called the 5 unlucky days at the end of the year Wayeb.

The Classic Maya, used the Long Count to record dates within periods longer than the 52 year calendar round. The post-Classic Maya used an abbreviated short count. Many Maya Long Count inscriptions also have a supplementary series which can record which one of the nine Lords of the Night rules, a Lunar series which has information about the lunar cycle, such as lunar phase and position of the Moon in a six lunation cycle and length of the current lunation and an 819-day count.

Central Mexican Calendar

The Central Mexican calendar system is best known in the form that was used by the Aztecs, but similar calendars were used by the Mixtecs, Zapotecs, Tlapanecs, Otomi, Matlatzinca, Totonac, Huastecs, Purépecha and at Teotihuacan. These calendars differed from the Maya version mainly in that they didn't use the long count to fix dates into a larger chronological frame than the 52-year cycle.

The Aztecs referred to the 365 and 260-day cycles as xiuhpohualli (year count) and tonalpohualli (day count) respectively. The veintena was called metztli (moon), and the five unlucky days at the end of the solar year were called nemontemi.

Other cycles
Other calendar cycles were also recorded, such as a lunar calendar, as well as the cycles of other astronomical objects, most importantly Venus.

See also
 Maya calendar
 Aztec calendar
 Inca calendar
 Dreamspell

Notes

References

 
 
 Bricker, Harvey M. and Victoria R. Bricker. "Correlation of Calendars." In Davíd Carrasco (ed). The Oxford Encyclopedia of Mesoamerican Cultures. Vol 1. New York : Oxford University Press, 2001. 
 
 
 
 
 John S. Justeson and Terrence Kaufman. "Mesoamerican Calendars". In Davíd Carrasco (ed). The Oxford Encyclopedia of Mesoamerican Cultures.'' Vol 1. New York : Oxford University Press, 2001.  

 
 
 Milbrath, Susan. "Calendar Wheels." In Davíd Carrasco (ed). The Oxford Encyclopedia of Mesoamerican Cultures Vol 1. New York : Oxford University Press, 2001.

External links

 Mesoamerican Archaeoastronomy and calendars, James Q. Jacobs (1999)
 Mesoamerican calendars